Field Marshal Bernard Law Montgomery, 1st Viscount Montgomery of Alamein,  (17 November 1887 – 24 March 1976), nicknamed "Monty", was a senior British Army officer who served in the First World War, the Irish War of Independence and the Second World War.

Montgomery first saw action in the First World War as a junior officer of the Royal Warwickshire Regiment. At Méteren, near the Belgian border at Bailleul, he was shot through the right lung by a sniper, during the First Battle of Ypres. On returning to the Western Front as a general staff officer, he took part in the Battle of Arras in AprilMay 1917. He also took part in the Battle of Passchendaele in late 1917 before finishing the war as chief of staff of the 47th (2nd London) Division.

In the inter-war years he commanded the 17th (Service) Battalion, Royal Fusiliers and, later, the 1st Battalion, Royal Warwickshire Regiment before becoming commander of the 9th Infantry Brigade and then General officer commanding (GOC), 8th Infantry Division.

During the Western Desert campaign of the Second World War, Montgomery commanded the British Eighth Army from August 1942, through the Second Battle of El Alamein and on to the final Allied victory in Tunisia in May 1943. He subsequently commanded the British Eighth Army during the Allied invasion of Sicily and the Allied invasion of Italy and was in command of all Allied ground forces during the Battle of Normandy (Operation Overlord), from D-Day on 6 June 1944 until 1 September 1944. He then continued in command of the 21st Army Group for the rest of the North West Europe campaign, including the failed attempt to cross the Rhine during Operation Market Garden.

When German armoured forces broke through the US lines in Belgium during the Battle of the Bulge, Montgomery received command of the northern shoulder of the Bulge. This included temporary command of the US First Army and the US Ninth Army, which held up the German advance to the north of the Bulge while the US Third Army under Lieutenant General George Patton relieved Bastogne from the south.

Montgomery's 21st Army Group, including the US Ninth Army and the First Allied Airborne Army, crossed the Rhine in Operation Plunder in March 1945, two weeks after the US First Army had crossed the Rhine in the Battle of Remagen. By the end of the war, troops under Montgomery's command had taken part in the encirclement of the Ruhr Pocket, liberated the Netherlands, and captured much of north-west Germany. On 4 May 1945, Montgomery accepted the surrender of the German forces in north-western Europe at Lüneburg Heath, south of Hamburg, after the surrender of Berlin to the USSR on 2 May.

After the war he became Commander-in-Chief of the British Army of the Rhine (BAOR) in Germany and then Chief of the Imperial General Staff (1946–1948). From 1948 to 1951, he served as Chairman of the Commanders-in-Chief Committee of the Western Union. He then served as NATO's Deputy Supreme Allied Commander Europe until his retirement in 1958.

Early life
Montgomery was born in Kennington, Surrey, in 1887, the fourth child of nine, to a Church of Ireland minister, Henry Montgomery, and his wife, Maud (née Farrar). The Montgomerys, an Ulster-Scots 'Ascendancy' gentry family, were the County Donegal branch of the Clan Montgomery. The Rev. Henry Montgomery, at that time Vicar of St Mark's Church, Kennington, was the second son of Sir Robert Montgomery, a native of Inishowen in County Donegal in the north-west of Ulster, the noted colonial administrator in British India; Sir Robert died a month after his grandson's birth. He was probably a descendant of Colonel Alexander Montgomery (1686–1729). Bernard's mother, Maud, was the daughter of The V. Rev. Frederic William Canon Farrar, the famous preacher, and was eighteen years younger than her husband.

After the death of Sir Robert Montgomery, Henry inherited the Montgomery ancestral estate of New Park in Moville, a small town in Inishowen in the north of County Donegal in Ulster, the northern province in Ireland. There was still £13,000 to pay on a mortgage, a large debt in the 1880s (equivalent to £ in ) and Henry was at the time still only an Anglican vicar. Despite selling off all the farms that were at Ballynally, "there was barely enough to keep up New Park and pay for the blasted summer holiday" (i.e., at New Park).

It was a financial relief of some magnitude when, in 1889, Henry was made Bishop of Tasmania, then still a British colony and Bernard spent his formative years there. Bishop Montgomery considered it his duty to spend as much time as possible in the rural areas of Tasmania and was away for up to six months at a time. While he was away, his wife, still in her mid-twenties, gave her children "constant" beatings, then ignored them most of the time as she performed the public duties of the bishop's wife. Of Bernard's siblings, Sibyl died prematurely in Tasmania, and Harold, Donald and Una all emigrated. Maud Montgomery took little active interest in the education of her young children other than to have them taught by tutors brought from Britain, although he briefly attended the then coeducational St Michael's Collegiate School. The loveless environment made Bernard something of a bully, as he himself recalled, "I was a dreadful little boy. I don't suppose anybody would put up with my sort of behaviour these days." Later in life Montgomery refused to allow his son David to have anything to do with his grandmother, and refused to attend her funeral in 1949.

The family returned to England once for a Lambeth Conference in 1897, and Bernard and his brother Harold were educated at The King's School, Canterbury. In 1901, Bishop Montgomery became secretary of the Society for the Propagation of the Gospel, and the family returned to London. Montgomery attended St Paul's School and then the Royal Military College, Sandhurst, from which he was almost expelled for rowdiness and violence. On graduation in September 1908 he was commissioned into the 1st Battalion the Royal Warwickshire Regiment as a second lieutenant, and first saw overseas service later that year in India. He was promoted to lieutenant in 1910, and in 1912 became adjutant of the 1st Battalion of his regiment at Shorncliffe Army Camp.

First World War

The Great War began in August 1914 and Montgomery moved to France with his battalion that month, which was at the time part of the 10th Brigade of the 4th Division. He saw action at the Battle of Le Cateau that month and during the retreat from Mons. At Méteren, near the Belgian border at Bailleul on 13 October 1914, during an Allied counter-offensive, he was shot through the right lung by a sniper. Montgomery was hit once more, in the knee. He was awarded the Distinguished Service Order for gallant leadership: the citation for this award, published in the London Gazette in December 1914 reads:

After recovering in early 1915, he was appointed brigade major, first of the 112th Brigade, and then with 104th Brigade training in Lancashire. He returned to the Western Front in early 1916 as a general staff officer in the 33rd Division and took part in the Battle of Arras in AprilMay 1917. He became a general staff officer with IX Corps, part of General Sir Herbert Plumer's Second Army, in July 1917.

Montgomery served at the Battle of Passchendaele in late 1917 before finishing the war as GSO1 (effectively chief of staff) of the 47th (2nd London) Division, with the temporary rank of lieutenant-colonel. A photograph from October 1918, reproduced in many biographies, shows the then unknown Lieutenant-Colonel Montgomery standing in front of Winston Churchill (then the Minister of Munitions) at the parade following the liberation of Lille.

Between the world wars

1920s
After the First World War Montgomery commanded the 17th (Service) Battalion of the Royal Fusiliers, a battalion in the British Army of the Rhine, before reverting to his substantive rank of captain (brevet major) in November 1919. He had not at first been selected for the Staff College in Camberley, Surrey (his only hope of ever achieving high command). But at a tennis party in Cologne, he was able to persuade the Commander-in-chief (C-in-C) of the British Army of Occupation, Field Marshal Sir William Robertson, to add his name to the list.

After graduating from the Staff College, he was appointed brigade major in the 17th Infantry Brigade in January 1921. The brigade was stationed in County Cork, Ireland, carrying out counter-insurgency operations during the final stages of the Irish War of Independence.

Montgomery came to the conclusion that the conflict could not be won without harsh measures, and that self-government for Ireland was the only feasible solution; in 1923, after the establishment of the Irish Free State and during the Irish Civil War, Montgomery wrote to Colonel Arthur Ernest Percival of the Essex Regiment:

In one noteworthy incident on 2 May 1922, Montgomery led a force of 60 soldiers and 4 armoured cars to the town of Macroom to search for four British officers who were missing in the area. While he had hoped the show of force would assist in finding the men, he was under strict orders not to attack the IRA. On arriving in the town square in front of Macroom Castle he summoned the IRA commander, Charlie Browne, to parley. At the castle gates Montgomery spoke to Browne explaining what would happen should the officers not be released. Once finished Browne responded with his own ultimatum to Montgomery to "leave town within 10 minutes". Browne then turned heels and returned to the Castle. At this point another IRA officer, Pat O'Sullivan, whistled to Montgomery drawing his attention to scores of IRA volunteers who had quietly taken up firing positions all around the square - surrounding Montgomery's forces. Realising his precarious position, Montgomery led his troops out of the town, a decision which raised hostile questions in the House of Commons but was later approved by Montgomery's own superiors. Unknown to Montgomery at this time, the four missing officers had already been executed.

In May 1923, Montgomery was posted to the 49th (West Riding) Infantry Division, a Territorial Army (TA) formation. He returned to the 1st Battalion, Royal Warwickshire Regiment in 1925 as a company commander and was promoted to major in July 1925. From January 1926 to January 1929 he served as Deputy Assistant Adjutant General at the Staff College, Camberley, in the temporary rank of lieutenant-colonel.

Marriage and family 
In 1925, in his first known courtship of a woman, Montgomery, then in his late thirties, proposed to a 17-year-old girl, Betty Anderson. His approach included drawing diagrams in the sand of how he would deploy his tanks and infantry in a future war, a contingency which seemed very remote at that time. She respected his ambition and single-mindedness, but declined his proposal of marriage.

In 1927, he met and married Elizabeth (Betty) Carver, née Hobart. She was the sister of the future Second World War commander Major-General Sir Percy Hobart. Betty Carver had two sons in their early teens, John and Dick, from her first marriage to Oswald Carver. Dick Carver later wrote that it had been "a very brave thing" for Montgomery to take on a widow with two children. Montgomery's son, David, was born in August 1928.

While on holiday in Burnham-on-Sea in 1937, Betty suffered an insect bite which became infected, and she died in her husband's arms from septicaemia following amputation of her leg. The loss devastated Montgomery, who was then serving as a brigadier, but he insisted on throwing himself back into his work immediately after the funeral. Montgomery's marriage had been extremely happy. Much of his correspondence with his wife was destroyed when his quarters at Portsmouth were bombed during the Second World War. After Montgomery's death, John Carver wrote that his mother had arguably done the country a favour by keeping his personal oddities—his extreme single-mindedness, and his intolerance of and suspicion of the motives of others—within reasonable bounds long enough for him to have a chance of attaining high command.

Both of Montgomery's stepsons became army officers in the 1930s (both were serving in India at the time of their mother's death), and both served in the Second World War, each eventually attaining the rank of colonel. While serving as a GSO2 with Eighth Army, Dick Carver was sent forward during the pursuit after El Alamein to help identify a new site for Eighth Army HQ. He was taken prisoner at Mersa Matruh on 7 November 1942. Montgomery wrote to his contacts in England asking that inquiries be made via the Red Cross as to where his stepson was being held, and that parcels be sent to him. Like many British POWs, the most famous being General Richard O'Connor, Dick Carver escaped in September 1943 during the brief hiatus between Italy's departure from the war and the German seizure of the country. He eventually reached British lines on 5 December 1943, to the delight of his stepfather, who sent him home to Britain to recuperate.

1930s
In January 1929 Montgomery was promoted to brevet lieutenant-colonel. That month he returned to the 1st Battalion, Royal Warwickshire Regiment again, as Commander of Headquarters Company; he went to the War Office to help write the Infantry Training Manual in mid-1929. In 1931 Montgomery was promoted to substantive lieutenant-colonel and became the Commanding officer (CO) of the 1st Battalion, Royal Warwickshire Regiment and saw service in Palestine and British India. He was promoted to colonel in June 1934 (seniority from January 1932). He attended and was then recommended to become an instructor at the Indian Army Staff College (now the Pakistan Command and Staff College) in Quetta, British India.

On completion of his tour of duty in India, Montgomery returned to Britain in June 1937 where he took command of the 9th Infantry Brigade with the temporary rank of brigadier. His wife died that year.

In 1938, he organised an amphibious combined operations landing exercise that impressed the new C-in-C of Southern Command, General Sir Archibald Percival Wavell. He was promoted to major-general on 14 October 1938 and took command of the 8th Infantry Division in the British mandate of Palestine. In Palestine, Montgomery was involved in suppressing an Arab revolt which had broken out over opposition to Jewish emigration. He returned in July 1939 to Britain, suffering a serious illness on the way, to command the 3rd (Iron) Infantry Division. Reporting the suppression of the revolt in April 1939, Montgomery wrote, "I shall be sorry to leave Palestine in many ways, as I have enjoyed the war out here".

Second World War

British Expeditionary Force

Phoney war

Britain declared war on Germany on 3 September 1939 and the 3rd Division, together with its new General Officer Commanding (GOC), was deployed to France as part of the British Expeditionary Force (BEF), commanded by General Lord Gort. Shortly after the division's arrival overseas, Montgomery faced serious trouble from his military superiors and the clergy for his frank attitude regarding the sexual health of his soldiers, but was defended from dismissal by his superior Alan Brooke, commander of II Corps, of which Montgomery's division formed a part. Montgomery had issued a circular on the prevention of venereal disease, worded in such "obscene language" that both the Church of England and Roman Catholic senior chaplains objected; Brooke told Monty that he did not want any further errors of this kind, though deciding not to get him to formally withdraw it as it would remove any "vestige of respect" left for him.

Although Montgomery's new command was a Regular Army formation, comprising the 7th (Guards), and the 8th and 9th Infantry Brigades along with supporting units, he was not impressed with its readiness for battle. As a result, while most of the rest of the BEF set about preparing defences for an expected German attack sometime in the future, Montgomery began training his 3rd Division in offensive tactics, organizing several exercises, each of which lasted for several days at a time. Mostly they revolved around the division advancing towards an objective, often a river line, only to come under attack and forced to withdraw to another position, usually behind another river. These exercises usually occurred at night with only very minimal lighting being allowed. By the spring of 1940 Montgomery's division had gained a reputation of being a very agile and flexible formation. By then the Allies had agreed to Plan D, where they would advance deep into Belgium and take up positions on the River Dyle by the time the German forces attacked. Brooke, Montgomery's corps commander, was pessimistic about the plan but Montgomery, in contrast, was not concerned, believing that he and his division would perform well regardless of the circumstances, particularly in a war of movement.

Battle of France

Montgomery's training paid off when the Germans began their invasion of the Low Countries on 10 May 1940 and the 3rd Division advanced to its planned position, near the Belgian city of Louvain. Soon after arrival, the division was fired on by members of the Belgian 10th Infantry Division who mistook them for German paratroopers; Montgomery resolved the incident by approaching them and offering to place himself under Belgian command, although Montgomery himself took control when the Germans arrived. During this time he began to develop a particular habit, which he would keep throughout the war, of going to bed at 21:30 every night without fail and giving only a single order−that he was not to be disturbed, which was only very rarely disobeyed.

The 3rd Division saw little action compared to many other units and formations in the BEF but, owing to the strict training methods of Montgomery, who ensured that his division was thoroughly well-trained, disciplined and rehearsed, the division always managed to be in the right place at the right time, especially so during the retreat into France. By 27 May, when the Belgian Army on the left flank of the BEF began to disintegrate, the 3rd Division achieved something very difficult, the movement at night from the right to the left of another division and only 2,000 yards behind it. This was performed with great professionalism and occurred without any incidents and thereby filled a very vulnerable gap in the BEF's defensive line. On 29/30 May, as the 3rd Division moved into the Dunkirk bridgehead, Montgomery temporarily took over from Brooke, who received orders to return to the United Kingdom, as GOC of II Corps for the final stages of the Dunkirk evacuation.

The 3rd Division, temporarily commanded by Kenneth Anderson in Montgomery's absence, returned to Britain intact with minimal casualties. Operation Dynamo—codename for the Dunkirk evacuation—saw 330,000 Allied military personnel, including most of the BEF, to Britain, although the BEF was forced to leave behind a significant amount of equipment.

Service in the United Kingdom 1940−1942

On his return Montgomery antagonised the War Office with trenchant criticisms of the command of the BEF and was briefly relegated back to divisional command of 3rd Division. The 3rd Division was at that time the only fully equipped division in Britain. He was made a Companion of the Order of the Bath.

Montgomery was ordered to make ready his 3rd Division to invade the neutral Portuguese Azores. Models of the islands were prepared and detailed plans worked out for the invasion. The invasion plans did not go ahead and plans switched to invading Cape Verde island also belonging to neutral Portugal. These invasion plans also did not go ahead. Montgomery was then ordered to prepare plans for the invasion of neutral Ireland and to seize Cork, Cobh and Cork harbour. These invasion plans, like those of the Portuguese islands, also did not go ahead and in July 1940, Montgomery was appointed acting lieutenant-general, and, after handing over command of his division to James Gammell, he was placed in command of V Corps, responsible for the defence of Hampshire and Dorset, and started a long-running feud with the new Commander-in-chief (C-in-C) of Southern Command, Lieutenant-General Claude Auchinleck.

In April 1941, he became commander of XII Corps responsible for the defence of Kent. During this period he instituted a regime of continuous training and insisted on high levels of physical fitness for both officers and other ranks. He was ruthless in sacking officers he considered would be unfit for command in action. Promoted to temporary lieutenant-general in July, in December Montgomery was given command of South-Eastern Command overseeing the defence of Kent, Sussex and Surrey.

He renamed his command the South-Eastern Army to promote offensive spirit. During this time he further developed and rehearsed his ideas and trained his soldiers, culminating in Exercise Tiger in May 1942, a combined forces exercise involving 100,000 troops.

North Africa and Italy

Montgomery's early command

In 1942, a new field commander was required in the Middle East, where Auchinleck was fulfilling both the role of Commander-in-chief (C-in-C) of Middle East Command and commander Eighth Army. He had stabilised the Allied position at the First Battle of El Alamein, but after a visit in August 1942, the Prime Minister, Winston Churchill, replaced him as C-in-C with General Sir Harold Alexander and William Gott as commander of the Eighth Army in the Western Desert. However, after Gott was killed flying back to Cairo, Churchill was persuaded by Brooke, who by this time was Chief of the Imperial General Staff (CIGS), to appoint Montgomery, who had only just been nominated to replace Alexander, as commander of the British First Army for Operation Torch, the invasion of French North Africa.

A story, probably apocryphal but popular at the time, is that the appointment caused Montgomery to remark that "After having an easy war, things have now got much more difficult." A colleague is supposed to have told him to cheer up—at which point Montgomery said "I'm not talking about me, I'm talking about Rommel!"

Montgomery's assumption of command transformed the fighting spirit and abilities of the Eighth Army. Taking command on 13 August 1942, he immediately became a whirlwind of activity. He ordered the creation of the X Corps, which contained all armoured divisions, to fight alongside his XXX Corps, which was all infantry divisions. This arrangement differed from the German Panzer Corps: one of Rommel's Panzer Corps combined infantry, armour and artillery units under one corps commander. The only common commander for Montgomery's all-infantry and all-armour corps was the Eighth Army Commander himself. Correlli Barnett commented that Montgomery's solution "... was in every way opposite to Auchinleck's and in every way wrong, for it carried the existing dangerous separatism still further." He asked Alexander to send him two new British divisions (51st Highland and 44th Home Counties) that were then arriving in Egypt and were scheduled to be deployed in defence of the Nile Delta. He moved his field HQ to Burg al Arab, close to the Air Force command post in order to better coordinate combined operations.

Montgomery was determined that the army, navy and air forces should fight their battles in a unified, focused manner according to a detailed plan. He ordered immediate reinforcement of the vital heights of Alam Halfa, just behind his own lines, expecting the German commander, Erwin Rommel, to attack with the heights as his objective, something that Rommel soon did. Montgomery ordered all contingency plans for retreat to be destroyed. "I have cancelled the plan for withdrawal. If we are attacked, then there will be no retreat. If we cannot stay here alive, then we will stay here dead", he told his officers at the first meeting he held with them in the desert, though, in fact, Auchinleck had no plans to withdraw from the strong defensive position he had chosen and established at El Alamein.

Montgomery made a great effort to appear before troops as often as possible, frequently visiting various units and making himself known to the men, often arranging for cigarettes to be distributed. Although he still wore a standard British officer's cap on arrival in the desert, he briefly wore an Australian broad-brimmed hat before switching to wearing the black beret (with the badge of the Royal Tank Regiment and the British General Officer's badge) for which he became notable. The black beret was offered to him by Jim Fraser while the latter was driving him on an inspection tour. Both Brooke and Alexander were astonished by the transformation in atmosphere when they visited on 19 August, less than a week after Montgomery had taken command.

Alanbrooke said that Churchill was always impatient for his generals to attack at once, and he wrote that Montgomery was always "my Monty" when Montgomery was out of favour with Churchill! Eden had some late night drinks with Churchill, and Eden said at a meeting of the Chiefs of Staff the next day (29 October 1942) that the Middle East offensive was "petering out". Alanbrooke had told Churchill "fairly plainly" what he thought of Eden's ability to judge the tactical situation from a distance, and was supported at the Chiefs of Staff meeting by Smuts.

First battles with Rommel

Rommel attempted to turn the left flank of the Eighth Army at the Battle of Alam el Halfa from 31 August 1942. The German/Italian armoured corps infantry attack was stopped in very heavy fighting. Rommel's forces had to withdraw urgently lest their retreat through the British minefields be cut off. Montgomery was criticised for not counter-attacking the retreating forces immediately, but he felt strongly that his methodical build-up of British forces was not yet ready. A hasty counter-attack risked ruining his strategy for an offensive on his own terms in late October, planning for which had begun soon after he took command. He was confirmed in the permanent rank of lieutenant-general in mid-October.

The conquest of Libya was essential for airfields to support Malta and to threaten the rear of Axis forces opposing Operation Torch. Montgomery prepared meticulously for the new offensive after convincing Churchill that the time was not being wasted. (Churchill sent a telegram to Alexander on 23 September 1942 which began, "We are in your hands and of course a victorious battle makes amends for much delay.") He was determined not to fight until he thought there had been sufficient preparation for a decisive victory, and put into action his beliefs with the gathering of resources, detailed planning, the training of troops—especially in clearing minefields and fighting at night—and in the use of 252 of the latest American-built Sherman tanks, 90 M7 Priest self-propelled howitzers, and making a personal visit to every unit involved in the offensive. By the time the offensive was ready in late October, Eighth Army had 231,000 men on its ration strength.

El Alamein

The Second Battle of El Alamein began on 23 October 1942, and ended 12 days later with one of the first large-scale, decisive Allied land victories of the war. Montgomery correctly predicted both the length of the battle and the number of casualties (13,500).

Historian Correlli Barnett has pointed out that the rain also fell on the Germans, and that the weather is therefore an inadequate explanation for the failure to exploit the breakthrough, but nevertheless the Battle of El Alamein had been a great success. Over 30,000 prisoners of war were taken, including the German second-in-command, General von Thoma, as well as eight other general officers. Rommel, having been in a hospital in Germany at the start of the battle, was forced to return on 25 October 1942 after Stumme—his replacement as German commander—died of a heart attack in the early hours of the battle.

Tunisia

Montgomery was advanced to KCB and promoted to full general. He kept the initiative, applying superior strength when it suited him, forcing Rommel out of each successive defensive position. On 6 March 1943, Rommel's attack on the over-extended Eighth Army at Medenine (Operation Capri) with the largest concentration of German armour in North Africa was successfully repulsed. At the Mareth Line, 20 to 27 March, when Montgomery encountered fiercer frontal opposition than he had anticipated, he switched his major effort into an outflanking inland pincer, backed by low-flying RAF fighter-bomber support. For his role in North Africa he was awarded the Legion of Merit by the United States government in the rank of Chief Commander.

Sicily

The next major Allied attack was the Allied invasion of Sicily (Operation Husky). Montgomery considered the initial plans for the Allied invasion, which had been agreed in principle by General Dwight D. Eisenhower, the Supreme Allied Commander Allied Forces Headquarters, and General Alexander, the 15th Army Group commander, to be unworkable because of the dispersion of effort. He managed to have the plans recast to concentrate the Allied forces, having Lieutenant General George Patton's US Seventh Army land in the Gulf of Gela (on the Eighth Army's left flank, which landed around Syracuse in the south-east of Sicily) rather than near Palermo in the west and north of Sicily. Inter-Allied tensions grew as the American commanders, Patton and Omar Bradley (then commanding US II Corps under Patton), took umbrage at what they saw as Montgomery's attitudes and boastfulness. However, while they were considered three of the greatest soldiers of their time, due to their competitiveness they were renowned for "squabbling like three schoolgirls" thanks to their "bitchiness", "whining to their superiors" and "showing off".

Italian campaign

During late 1943, Montgomery continued to command the Eighth Army during the landings on the mainland of Italy itself, beginning with Operation Baytown. In conjunction with the Anglo-American landings at Salerno (near Naples) by Lieutenant General Mark Clark's US Fifth Army and seaborne landings by British paratroops in the heel of Italy (including the key port of Taranto, where they disembarked without resistance directly into the port), Montgomery led the Eighth Army up the toe of Italy. Montgomery abhorred what he considered to be a lack of coordination, a dispersion of effort, a strategic muddle and a lack of opportunism in the Allied effort in Italy, and he said that he was glad to leave the "dog's breakfast" on 23 December 1943.

Normandy

Montgomery returned to Britain in January 1944. He was assigned to command the 21st Army Group consisting of all Allied ground forces participating in Operation Overlord, codename for the Allied invasion of Normandy. Overall direction was assigned to the Supreme Allied Commander of the Allied Expeditionary Forces, American General Dwight D. Eisenhower. Both Churchill and Eisenhower had found Montgomery difficult to work with in the past and wanted the position to go to the more affable General Sir Harold Alexander. However Montgomery's patron, General Sir Alan Brooke, firmly argued that Montgomery was a much superior general to Alexander and ensured his appointment. Without Brooke's support, Montgomery would have remained in Italy. At St Paul's School on 7 April and 15 May Montgomery presented his strategy for the invasion. He envisaged a ninety-day battle, with all forces reaching the Seine. The campaign would pivot on an Allied-held Caen in the east of the Normandy bridgehead, with relatively static British and Canadian armies forming a shoulder to attract and defeat German counter-attacks, relieving the US armies who would move and seize the Cotentin Peninsula and Brittany, wheeling south and then east on the right forming a pincer.

During the ten weeks of the Battle of Normandy, unfavourable autumnal weather conditions disrupted the Normandy landing areas. Montgomery's initial plan was for the Anglo-Canadian troops under his command to break out immediately from their beachheads on the Calvados coast towards Caen with the aim of taking the city on either D Day or two days later. Montgomery attempted to take Caen with the 3rd Infantry Division, 50th (Northumbrian) Infantry Division and the 3rd Canadian Division but was stopped from 6–8 June by 21st Panzer Division and 12th SS Panzer Division Hitlerjugend, who hit the advancing Anglo-Canadian troops very hard. Rommel followed up this success by ordering the 2nd Panzer Division to Caen while Field Marshal Gerd von Rundstedt asked for and received permission from Hitler to have the elite 1st Waffen SS Division Leibstandarte Adolf Hitler and 2nd Waffen SS Division Das Reich sent to Caen as well. Montgomery thus had to face what Stephen Badsey called the "most formidable" of all the German divisions in France. The 12th Waffen SS Division Hitlerjugend, as its name implies, was drawn entirely from the more fanatical elements of the Hitler Youth and commanded by the ruthless SS-Brigadeführer Kurt Meyer, aka "Panzer Meyer".

The failure to take Caen immediately has been the source of an immense historiographical dispute with bitter nationalist overtones. Broadly, there has been a "British school" which accepts Montgomery's post-war claim that he never intended to take Caen at once, and instead the Anglo-Canadian operations around Caen were a "holding operation" intended to attract the bulk of the German forces towards the Caen sector to allow the Americans to stage the "break out operation" on the left flank of the German positions, which was all part of Montgomery's "Master Plan" that he had conceived long before the Normandy campaign. By contrast, the "American school" argued that Montgomery's initial "master plan" was for the 21st Army Group to take Caen at once and move his tank divisions into the plains south of Caen, to then stage a breakout that would lead the 21st Army Group into the plains of northern France and hence into Antwerp and finally the Ruhr. Letters written by Eisenhower at the time of the battle make it clear that Eisenhower was expecting from Montgomery "the early capture of the important focal point of Caen". Later, when this plan had clearly failed, Eisenhower wrote that Montgomery had "evolved" the plan to have the US forces achieve the break-out instead.

As the campaign progressed, Montgomery altered his initial plan for the invasion and continued the strategy of attracting and holding German counter-attacks in the area north of Caen rather than to the south, to allow the U.S. First Army in the west to take Cherbourg. A memo summarising Montgomery's operations written by Eisenhower's chief of staff, General Walter Bedell Smith who met with Montgomery in late June 1944 says nothing about Montgomery conducting a "holding operation" in the Caen sector, and instead speaks of him seeking a "breakout" into the plains south of the Seine. On 12 June, Montgomery ordered the 7th Armoured Division into an attack against the Panzer Lehr Division that made good progress at first but ended when the Panzer Lehr was joined by the 2nd Panzer Division. At Villers Bocage on 14 June, the British lost twenty Cromwell tanks to five Tiger tanks led by SS Obersturmführer Michael Wittmann, in about five minutes. Despite the setback at Villers Bocage, Montgomery was still optimistic as the Allies were landing more troops and supplies than they were losing in battle, and though the German lines were holding, the Wehrmacht and Waffen SS were suffering considerable attrition. Air Marshal Sir Arthur Tedder complained that it was impossible to move fighter squadrons to France until Montgomery had captured some airfields, something he asserted that Montgomery appeared incapable of doing. The first V-1 flying bomb attacks on London, which started on 13 June, further increased the pressure on Montgomery from Whitehall to speed up his advance.

On 18 June, Montgomery ordered Bradley to take Cherbourg while the British were to take Caen by 23 June. In Operation Epsom, the British VII Corps commanded by Sir Richard O'Connor attempted to outflank Caen from the west by breaking through the dividing line between the Panzer Lehr and the 12th SS to take the strategic Hill 112. Epsom began well with O'Connor's assault force (the British 15th Scottish Division) breaking through and with the 11th Armoured Division stopping the counter-attacks of the 12th SS Division. General Friedrich Dollmann of Seventh Army had to commit the newly arrived II SS Corps to stop the British offensive. Dollmann, fearing that Epsom would be a success, committed suicide and was replaced by SS Oberstegruppenführer Paul Hausser. After Epsom, Montgomery had to tell General Harry Crerar that the activation of the First Canadian Army would have to wait as there was only room at present, in the Caen sector, for the newly arrived XII Corps under Lieutenant-General Neil Ritchie, which caused some tension with Crerar, who was anxious to get into the field. Epsom had forced further German forces into Caen but all through June and the first half of July Rommel, Rundstedt, and Hitler were engaged in planning for a great offensive to drive the British into the sea; it was never launched and would have required the commitment of a large number of German forces to the Caen sector.

It was only after several failed attempts to break out in the Caen sector that Montgomery devised what he later called his "master plan" of having the 21st Army Group hold the bulk of the German forces, thus allowing the Americans to break out. The Canadian historians Terry Copp and Robert Vogel wrote about the dispute between the "American school" and "British school" after having suffered several setbacks in June 1944:

Hampered by stormy weather and the bocage terrain, Montgomery had to ensure that Rommel focused on the British in the east rather than the Americans in the west, who had to take the Cotentin Peninsula and Brittany before the Germans could be trapped by a general swing east. Montgomery told General Sir Miles Dempsey, the commander of Second British Army: "Go on hitting, drawing the German strength, especially some of the armour, onto yourself – so as to ease the way for Brad [Bradley]." The Germans had deployed twelve divisions, of which six were Panzer divisions, against the British while deploying eight divisions, of which three were Panzer divisions, against the Americans. By the middle of July Caen had not been taken, as Rommel continued to prioritise prevention of the break-out by British forces rather than the western territories being taken by the Americans. This was broadly as Montgomery had planned, albeit not with the same speed as he outlined at St Paul's, although as the American historian Carlo D'Este pointed out the actual situation in Normandy was "vastly different" from what was envisioned at the St. Paul's conference, as only one of four goals outlined in May had been achieved by 10 July.

On 7 July, Montgomery began Operation Charnwood with a carpet bombing offensive that turned much of the French countryside and the city of Caen into a wasteland. The British and Canadians succeeded in advancing into northern Caen before the Germans, who used the ruins to their advantage and stopped the offensive. On 10 July, Montgomery ordered Bradley to take Avranches, after which U.S. Third Army would be activated to drive towards Le Mans and Alençon. On 14 July 1944, Montgomery wrote to his patron Brooke, saying he had chosen on a "real show down on the eastern flanks, and to loose a Corps of three armoured divisions in the open country about the Caen-Falaise road ... The possibilities are immense; with seven hundred tanks loosed to the South-east of Caen, and the armoured cars operating far ahead, anything can happen." The French Resistance had launched Plan Violet in June 1944 to systematically destroy the telephone system of France, which forced the Germans to use their radios more and more to communicate, and as the code-breakers of Bletchley Park had broken many of the German codes, Montgomery had—via Ultra intelligence—a good idea of the German situation. Montgomery thus knew German Army Group B had lost 96,400 men while receiving 5,200 replacements and the Panzer Lehr Division now based at St. Lô was down to only 40 tanks. Montgomery later wrote that he knew he had the Normandy campaign won at this point as the Germans had almost no reserves while he had three armoured divisions in reserve.

An American break-out was achieved with Operation Cobra and the encirclement of German forces in the Falaise pocket at the cost of British losses with the diversionary Operation Goodwood. On the early morning of 18 July 1944, Operation Goodwood began with British heavy bombers beginning carpet bombing attacks that further devastated what was left of Caen and the surrounding countryside. Ahead of them the pathfinders were scattering their flares and before long the first bombs were dropping." A German tankman from the 21st Panzer Division at the receiving end of this bombardment remembered: "We saw little dots detach themselves from the planes, so many of them that the crazy thought occurred to us: are those leaflets? ... Among the thunder of the explosions, we could hear the wounded scream and the insane howling of men who had [been] driven mad." The British bombing had badly smashed the German front-line units; e.g., tanks were thrown up on the roofs of French farmhouses. Initially, the three British armoured divisions assigned to lead the offensive, the 7th, 11th and the Guards, made rapid progress and were soon approaching the Borguebus ridge, which dominated the landscape south of Caen, by noon.

If the British could take the Borguebus Ridge, the way to the plains of northern France would be wide open, and potentially Paris could be taken, which explains the ferocity with which the Germans defended the ridge. One German officer, Lieutenant Baron von Rosen, recalled that to motivate a Luftwaffe officer commanding a battery of four 88 mm guns to fight against the British tanks, he had to hold his handgun to the officer's head "and asked him whether he would like to be killed immediately or get a high decoration. He decided for the latter." The well dug-in 88 mm guns around the Borguebus Ridge began taking a toll on the British Sherman tanks, and the countryside was soon dotted with dozens of burning Shermans. One British officer reported with worry: "I see palls of smoke and tanks brewing up with flames belching forth from their turrets. I see men climbing out, on fire like torches, rolling on the ground to try and douse the flames." Despite Montgomery's orders to try to press on, fierce German counter-attacks stopped the British offensive.

The objectives of Operation Goodwood were all achieved except the complete capture of the Bourgebus Ridge, which was only partially taken. The operation was a strategic Allied success in drawing in the last German reserves in Normandy towards the Caen sector away from the American sector, greatly assisting the American breakout in Operation Cobra. By the end of Goodwood on 25 July 1944, the Canadians had finally taken Caen while the British tanks had reached the plains south of Caen, giving Montgomery the "hinge" he had been seeking, while forcing the Germans to commit the last of their reserves to stop the Anglo-Canadian offensive. Ultra decrypts indicated that the Germans now facing Bradley were seriously understrength, with Operation Cobra about to commence. During Operation Goodwood, the British had 400 tanks knocked out, with many recovered returning to service. Bradley recognised Montgomery's plan to pin down German armour and allow U.S. forces to break out:

The long-running dispute over what Montgomery's "master plan" in Normandy led historians to differ greatly about the purpose of Goodwood. The British journalist Mark Urban wrote that the purpose of Goodwood was to draw German troops to their left flank to allow the American forces to break out on the right flank, arguing that Montgomery had to lie to his soldiers about the purpose of Goodwood, as the average British soldier would not have understood why they were being asked to create a diversion to allow the Americans to have the glory of staging the breakout with Operation Cobra. By contrast, the American historian Stephen Power argued that Goodwood was intended to be the "breakout" offensive and not a "holding operation", writing: "It is unrealistic to assert that an operation which called for the use of 4,500 Allied aircraft, 700 artillery pieces and over 8,000 armored vehicles and trucks and that cost the British over 5,500 casualties was conceived and executed for so limited an objective." Power noted that Goodwood and Cobra were supposed to take effect on the same day, 18 July 1944, but Cobra was cancelled owing to heavy rain in the American sector, and argued that both operations were meant to be breakout operations to trap the German armies in Normandy. American military writer Drew Middleton wrote that there is no doubt that Montgomery wanted Goodwood to provide a "shield" for Bradley, but at the same time Montgomery was clearly hoping for more than merely diverting German attention away from the American sector. British historian John Keegan pointed out that Montgomery made differing statements before Goodwood about the purpose of the operation. Keegan wrote that Montgomery engaged in what he called a "hedging of his bets" when drafting his plans for Goodwood, with a plan for a "break out if the front collapsed, if not, sound documentary evidence that all he had intended in the first place was a battle of attrition". Again Bradley confirmed Montgomery's plan and that the capture of Caen was only incidental to his mission, not critical. The American magazine LIFE quoted Bradley in 1951:

With Goodwood drawing the Wehrmacht towards the British sector, U.S. First Army enjoyed a two-to-one numerical superiority. General Omar Bradley accepted Montgomery's advice to begin the offensive by concentrating at one point instead of a "broad front" as Eisenhower would have preferred.

Operation Goodwood almost cost Montgomery his job, as Eisenhower seriously considered sacking him and only chose not to do so because to sack the popular "Monty" would have caused such a political backlash in Britain against the Americans at a critical moment in the war that the resulting strains in the Atlantic alliance were not considered worth it. Montgomery expressed his satisfaction at the results of Goodwood when calling the operation off. Eisenhower was under the impression that Goodwood was to be a break-out operation. Either there was a miscommunication between the two men or Eisenhower did not understand the strategy. Alan Brooke, chief of the British Imperial General Staff, wrote: "Ike knows nothing about strategy and is quite unsuited to the post of Supreme Commander. It is no wonder that Monty's real high ability is not always realised." Bradley fully understood Montgomery's intentions. Both men would not give away to the press the true intentions of their strategy.

Many American officers had found Montgomery a difficult man to work with, and after Goodwood, pressured Eisenhower to fire Montgomery. Although the Eisenhower–Montgomery dispute is sometimes depicted in nationalist terms as being an Anglo-American struggle, it was the British Air Marshal Arthur Tedder who was pressing Eisenhower most strongly after Goodwood to fire Montgomery. An American officer wrote in his diary that Tedder had come to see Eisenhower to "pursue his current favourite subject, the sacking of Monty". With Tedder leading the "sack Monty" campaign, it encouraged Montgomery's American enemies to press Eisenhower to fire Montgomery. Brooke was sufficiently worried about the "sack Monty" campaign to visit Montgomery at his Tactical Headquarters (TAC) in France and as he wrote in his diary; "warned [Montgomery] of a tendency in the PM [Churchill] to listen to suggestions that Monty played for safety and was not prepared to take risks". Brooke advised Montgomery to invite Churchill to Normandy, arguing that if the "sack Monty" campaign had won the Prime Minister over, then his career would be over, as having Churchill's backing would give Eisenhower the political "cover" to fire Montgomery. On 20 July, Montgomery met Eisenhower and on 21 July, Churchill, at the TAC in France. One of Montgomery's staff officers wrote afterwards that it was "common knowledge at Tac that Churchill had come to sack Monty". No notes were taken at the Eisenhower–Montgomery and Churchill–Montgomery meetings, but Montgomery was able to persuade both men not to fire him.

With the success of Cobra, which was soon followed by unleashing U.S. Third Army commanded by General George S. Patton, Eisenhower wrote to Montgomery: "Am delighted that your basic plan has begun brilliantly to unfold with Bradley's initial success." The success of Cobra was aided by Operation Spring, when the II Canadian Corps under General Guy Simonds (the only Canadian general whose skill Montgomery respected) began an offensive south of Caen that made little headway, but which the Germans regarded as the main offensive. Once Third Army arrived, Bradley was promoted to take command of the newly created 12th Army Group, consisting of U.S. First and Third Armies. Following the American breakout, there followed the Battle of Falaise Gap. British, Canadian, and Polish soldiers of 21st Army Group commanded by Montgomery advanced south, while the American and French soldiers of Bradley's 12th Army Group advanced north to encircle the German Army Group B at Falaise, as Montgomery waged what Urban called "a huge battle of annihilation" in August 1944. Montgomery began his offensive into the Suisse Normande region with Operation Bluecoat, with Sir Richard O'Connor's VIII Corps and Gerard Bucknall's XXX Corps heading south. A dissatisfied Montgomery sacked Bucknall for being insufficiently aggressive and replaced him with General Brian Horrocks. At the same time, Montgomery ordered Patton—whose Third Army was supposed to advance into Brittany—to instead capture Nantes, which was soon taken.

Hitler waited too long to order his soldiers to retreat from Normandy, leading Montgomery to write: "He [Hitler] refused to face the only sound military course. As a result the Allies caused the enemy staggering losses in men and materials." Knowing via Ultra that Hitler was not planning to retreat from Normandy, Montgomery, on 6 August 1944, ordered an envelopment operation against Army Group B—with the First Canadian Army under Harry Crerar to advance towards Falaise, British Second Army under Miles Dempsey to advance towards Argentan, and U.S. Third Army under George S. Patton to advance to Alençon. On 11 August, Montgomery changed his plan, with the Canadians to take Falaise and to meet the Americans at Argentan. The First Canadian Army launched two operations, Operation Totalize on 7 August, which advanced only  in four days in the face of fierce German resistance, and Operation Tractable on 14 August, which finally took Falaise on 17 August. In view of the slow Canadian advance, Patton requested permission to take Falaise, but was refused by Bradley on 13 August. This prompted much controversy, many historians arguing that Bradley lacked aggression and that Montgomery should have overruled Bradley.

The so-called Falaise Gap was closed on 22 August 1944, but several American generals, most notably Patton, accused Montgomery of being insufficiently aggressive in closing it. About 60,000 German soldiers were trapped in Normandy, but before 22 August, about 20,000 Germans had escaped through the Falaise Gap. About 10,000 Germans had been killed in the Battle of the Falaise Gap, which led a stunned Eisenhower, who viewed the battlefield on 24 August, to comment with horror that it was impossible to walk without stepping on corpses. The successful conclusion of the Normandy campaign saw the beginning of the debate between the "American school" and "British school" as both American and British generals started to advance claims about who was most responsible for this victory. Brooke wrote in defence of his protégé Montgomery: "Ike knows nothing about strategy and is 'quite' unsuited to the post of Supreme Commander. It is no wonder that Monty's real high ability is not always realised. Especially so when 'national' spectacles pervert the perspective of the strategic landscape." About Montgomery's conduct of the Normandy campaign, Badsey wrote:

Replaced as Ground Forces Commander

General Eisenhower took over Ground Forces Command on 1 September, while continuing as Supreme Commander, with Montgomery continuing to command the 21st Army Group, now consisting mainly of British and Canadian units. Montgomery bitterly resented this change, although it had been agreed before the D-Day invasion. The British journalist Mark Urban writes that Montgomery seemed unable to grasp that as the majority of the 2.2 million Allied soldiers fighting against Germany on the Western Front were now American (the ratio was 3:1) that it was politically unacceptable to American public opinion to have Montgomery remain as Land Forces Commander as: "Politics would not allow him to carry on giving orders to great armies of Americans simply because, in his view, he was better than their generals."

Winston Churchill had Montgomery promoted to field marshal by way of compensation.

Advance to the Rhine
By September, ports like Cherbourg were too far away from the front line, causing the Allies great logistical problems. Antwerp was the third largest port in Europe. It was a deep water inland port connected to the North Sea via the river Scheldt. The Scheldt was wide enough and dredged deep enough to allow the passage of ocean-going ships.

On 3 September 1944 Hitler ordered Fifteenth Army, which had been stationed in the Pas de Calais region and was withdrawing north into the Low Countries, to hold the mouth of the river Scheldt to deprive the Allies of the use of Antwerp. Field Marshal Gerd von Rundstedt, the German commander of the Western Front, ordered General Gustav-Adolf von Zangen, the commander of 15th Army, that: "The attempt of the enemy to occupy the West Scheldt in order to obtain the free use of the harbor of Antwerp must be resisted to the utmost" (emphasis in the original). Rundstedt argued with Hitler that as long as the Allies could not use the port of Antwerp, the Allies would lack the logistical capacity for an invasion of Germany.

The Witte Brigade (White Brigade) of the Belgian resistance had captured the Port of Antwerp before the Germans could destroy key port facilities, and on 4 September, Antwerp was captured by Horrocks with its harbour mostly intact. The British declined to immediately advance over the Albert Canal, and an opportunity to destroy the German Fifteenth Army was lost. The Germans had mined the river Scheldt, the mouth of the Scheldt was still in German hands making it impossible for the Royal Navy to clear the mines in the river, and therefore the port of Antwerp was still useless to the Allies.

On 5 September, SHAEF's naval commander, Admiral Sir Bertram Ramsay, had urged Montgomery to make clearing the mouth of the Scheldt his number-one priority. Alone among the senior commanders, only Ramsay saw opening Antwerp as crucial. Thanks to ULTRA, Montgomery was aware of Hitler's order by 5 September.

On 9 September, Montgomery wrote to Brooke that "one good Pas de Calais port" would be sufficient to meet all the logistical needs of the 21st Army Group, but only the supply needs of the same formation. At the same time, Montgomery noted that "one good Pas de Calais port" would be insufficient for the American armies in France, which would thus force Eisenhower, if for no other reasons than logistics, to favour Montgomery's plans for an invasion of northern Germany by the 21st Army Group, whereas if Antwerp were opened up, then all of the Allied armies could be supplied.

The importance of ports closer to Germany was highlighted with the liberation of the city of Le Havre, which was assigned to John Crocker's I Corps. To take Le Havre, two infantry divisions, two tank brigades, most of the artillery of the Second British Army, the specialized armoured "gadgets" of Percy Hobart's 79th Armoured Division, the battleship  and the monitor  were all committed. On 10 September 1944, Bomber Command dropped 4,719 tons of bombs on Le Havre, which was the prelude to Operation Astonia, the assault on Le Havre by Crocker's men, which was taken two days later. The Canadian historian Terry Copp wrote that the commitment of this much firepower and men to take only one French city might "seem excessive", but by this point, the Allies desperately needed ports closer to the front line to sustain their advance.

In September 1944, Montgomery ordered Crerar and his First Canadian Army to take the French ports on the English Channel, namely Calais, Boulogne and Dunkirk, and to clear the Scheldt, a task that Crerar stated was impossible as he lacked enough troops to perform both operations at once. Montgomery refused Crerar's request to have British XII Corps under Neil Ritchie assigned to help clear the Scheldt as Montgomery stated he needed XII Corps for Operation Market Garden. On 6 September 1944, Montgomery told Crerar that "I want Boulogne badly" and that city should be taken no matter what the cost. On 22 September 1944, General Guy Simonds's II Canadian Corps took Boulogne, followed up by taking Calais on 1 October 1944. Montgomery was highly impatient with Simonds, complaining that it had taken Crocker's I Corps only two days to take Le Havre while it took Simonds two weeks to take Boulogne and Calais, but Simonds noted that at Le Havre, three divisions and two brigades had been employed, whereas at both Boulogne and Calais, only two brigades were sent in to take both cities. After an attempt to storm the Leopold Canal by the 4th Canadian Division had been badly smashed by the German defenders, Simonds ordered a stop to further attempts to clear the river Scheldt until his mission of capturing the French ports on the English Channel had been accomplished; this allowed the German Fifteenth Army ample time to dig into its new home on the Scheldt. The only port that was not captured by the Canadians was Dunkirk, as Montgomery ordered the 2nd Canadian Division on 15 September to hold his flank at Antwerp as a prelude for an advance up the Scheldt.

Montgomery pulled away from the First Canadian Army (temporarily commanded now by Simonds as Crerar was ill), the British 51st Highland Division, 1st Polish Division, British 49th (West Riding) Division and 2nd Canadian Armoured Brigade, and sent all of these formations to help the Second British Army to expand the Market Garden salient with Operations Constellation, Aintree, and towards the end of October Pheasant. However, Simonds seems to have regarded the Scheldt campaign as a test of his ability, and he felt he could clear the Scheldt with only three Canadian divisions, namely the 2nd, the 3rd, and the 4th, despite having to take on the entire Fifteenth Army, which held strongly fortified positions in a landscape that favoured the defence. Simonds never complained about the lack of air support (made worse by the cloudy October weather), shortages of ammunition or having insufficient troops, regarding these problems as challenges for him to overcome, rather than a cause for complaint. As it was, Simonds made only slow progress in October 1944 during the fighting in the Battle of the Scheldt, although he was praised by Copp for imaginative and aggressive leadership who managed to achieve much, despite all of the odds against him. Montgomery had little respect for the Canadian generals, whom he dismissed as mediocre, with the exception of Simonds, whom he consistently praised as Canada's only "first-rate" general in the entire war.

Admiral Ramsay, who proved to be a far more articulate and forceful champion of the Canadians than their own generals, starting on 9 October demanded of Eisenhower in a meeting that he either order Montgomery to make supporting the First Canadian Army in the Scheldt fighting his number one priority or sack him. Ramsay in very strong language argued to Eisenhower that the Allies could only invade Germany if Antwerp was opened, and that as long as the three Canadian divisions fighting in the Scheldt had shortages of ammunition and artillery shells because Montgomery made the Arnhem salient his first priority, then Antwerp would not be opened anytime soon. Even Brooke wrote in his diary: "I feel that Monty's strategy for once is at fault. Instead of carrying out the advance to Arnhem he ought to have made certain of Antwerp". On 9 October 1944, at Ramsay's urging, Eisenhower sent Montgomery a cable that emphasized the "supreme importance of Antwerp", that "the Canadian Army will not, repeat not, be able to attack until November unless immediately supplied with adequate ammunition", and warned that the Allied advance into Germany would totally stop by mid-November unless Antwerp was opened by October. Montgomery replied by accusing Ramsay of making "wild statements" unsupported by the facts, denying the Canadians were having to ration ammunition, and claimed that he would soon take the Ruhr thereby making the Scheldt campaign a sideshow. Montgomery further issued a memo entitled "Notes on Command in Western Europe" demanding that he once again be made Land Forces Commander.  This led to an exasperated Eisenhower telling Montgomery that the question was not the command arrangement but rather his (Montgomery's) ability and willingness to obey orders.  Eisenhower further told Montgomery to either obey orders to immediately clear the mouth of the Scheldt or he would be sacked.

A chastised Montgomery told Eisenhower on 15 October 1944 that he was now making clearing the Scheldt his "top priority", and the ammunition shortages in the First Canadian Army, a problem which he denied even existed five days earlier, were now over as supplying the Canadians was henceforth his first concern. Simonds, now reinforced with British troops and Royal Marines, cleared the Scheldt by taking Walcheren island, the last of the German "fortresses" on the Scheldt, on 8 November 1944. With the Scheldt in Allied hands, Royal Navy minesweepers removed the German mines in the river, and Antwerp was finally opened to shipping on 28 November 1944. Reflecting Antwerp's importance, the Germans spent the winter of 1944–45 firing V-1 flying bombs and V-2 rockets at it in an attempt to shut down the port, and the German offensive in December 1944 in the Ardennes had as its ultimate objective the capture of Antwerp. Urban wrote that Montgomery's most "serious failure" in the entire war was not the well publicised Battle of Arnhem, but rather his lack of interest in opening up Antwerp, as without it the entire Allied advance from the North Sea to the Swiss Alps stalled in the autumn of 1944 for logistical reasons.

Operation Market Garden

Montgomery was able to persuade Eisenhower to allow him to test his strategy of a single thrust to the Ruhr with Operation Market Garden in September 1944. The offensive was strategically bold. Following the Allied breakout from Normandy, the Supreme Allied Commander of the Allied armies on the Western Front, General Dwight D. Eisenhower, favored pursuing the German armies northwards and eastwards to the Rhine on a broad front. Eisenhower relied on speed, which in turn depended on logistics, which were "stretched to the limit". Supreme Headquarters Allied Expeditionary Force (SHAEF) did provide Montgomery with additional resources, principally additional locomotives and rolling stock, and priority for air supply. Eisenhower's decision to launch Market Garden was influenced by his desire to keep the retreating Germans under pressure, and by the pressure from the United States to use the First Allied Airborne Army as soon as possible.

Montgomery's plan for Operation Market Garden (17–25 September 1944) was to outflank the Siegfried Line and cross the Rhine, setting the stage for later offensives into the Ruhr region. The 21st Army Group would attack north from Belgium,  through the Netherlands, across the Rhine and consolidate north of Arnhem on the far side of the Rhine. The risky plan required three Airborne Divisions to capture numerous intact bridges along a single-lane road, on which an entire Corps had to attack and use as its main supply route. The offensive failed to achieve its objectives.

Both Churchill and Montgomery claimed that the operation was nearly or 90% successful, although in Montgomery's equivocal acceptance of responsibility he blames lack of support, and also refers to the Battle of the Scheldt which was undertaken by Canadian troops not involved in Market Garden. Montgomery later said:

In the aftermath of Market Garden, Montgomery made holding the Arnhem salient his first priority, arguing that the Second British Army might still be able to break through and reach the wide open plains of northern Germany, and that he might be able to take the Ruhr by the end of October. The Germans under Field Marshal Walther Model in early October attempted to retake the Nijmegen salient but were beaten back. In the meantime, the First Canadian Army finally achieved the task of clearing the mouth of the river Scheldt, despite the fact that in the words of Copp and Vogel "... that Montgomery's Directive required the Canadians to continue to fight alone for almost two weeks in a battle which everyone agreed could only be won with the aid of additional divisions".

Battle of the Bulge
On 16 December 1944, at the start of the Battle of the Bulge, Montgomery's 21st Army Group was on the northern flank of the allied lines. Omar Bradley's US 12th Army Group was to Montgomery's south, with William Simpson's U.S. Ninth Army adjacent to 21st Army Group, Courtney Hodges' U.S. First Army, holding the Ardennes and George S. Patton's U.S. Third Army further south.

SHAEF believed the Wehrmacht was no longer capable of launching a major offensive, and that no offensive could be launched through such rugged terrain as the Ardennes Forest. Because of this, the area was held by refitting and newly arrived American formations. The Wehrmacht planned to exploit this by making a surprise attack through the Ardennes Forest whilst bad weather grounded Allied air power, splitting the Allied Armies in two. They would then turn north to recapture the port of Antwerp. If the attack were to succeed in capturing Antwerp, the whole of 21st Army Group, along with U.S. Ninth Army and most of U.S. First Army would be trapped without supplies behind German lines.

The attack initially advanced rapidly, splitting U.S. 12th Army Group in two, with all of U.S. Ninth Army and the bulk of U.S. First Army on the northern shoulder of the German 'bulge'. The 12th Army Group commander, Bradley, was located in Luxembourg, south of the bulge, making command of the U.S. forces north of the bulge problematic. As Montgomery was the nearest army group commander on the ground, on 20 December, Dwight D. Eisenhower temporarily transferred command of U.S. Ninth Army and U.S. First Army to Montgomery's 21st Army Group. Bradley was "concerned because it might discredit the American command" but that it might mean Montgomery would commit more of his reserves to the battle. In practice the change led to "great resentment on the part of many Americans, particularly at Headquarters, 12th Army Group, and Third Army".

Four days after Montgomery took command of the northern flank, the bad weather cleared and the USAAF and RAF resumed operations, inflicting heavy casualties on German troops and vehicles. Six days after Montgomery took command of the northern flank, General Patton's Third Army relieved the besieged American forces in Bastogne. Unable to advance further, and running out of fuel, the Wehrmacht abandoned the offensive.

Morelock states that Montgomery was preoccupied with leading a "single thrust offensive" to Berlin as the overall commander of Allied ground forces, and that he accordingly treated the Ardennes counteroffensive "as a sideshow, to be finished with the least possible effort and expenditure of resources."

Montgomery subsequently wrote of his actions:

After the war Hasso von Manteuffel, who commanded the 5th Panzer Army in the Ardennes, was imprisoned awaiting trial for war crimes. During this period he was interviewed by B. H. Liddell Hart, a British author who has since been accused of putting words in the mouths of German generals, and attempting to "rewrite the historical record". After conducting several interviews via an interpreter, Liddell Hart in a subsequent book attributed to Manteuffel the following statement about Montgomery's contribution to the battle in the Ardennes:

However, American historian Stephen Ambrose, writing in 1997, maintained that "Putting Monty in command of the northern flank had no effect on the battle". Ambrose wrote that: "Far from directing the victory, Montgomery had gotten in everyone's way, and had botched the counter-attack." General Omar Bradley blamed Montgomery's "stagnating conservatism" for his failure to counter-attack when ordered to do so by Eisenhower.

Command of U.S. First Army reverted to 12th Army Group on 17 January 1945, whilst command of U.S. Ninth Army remained with 21st Army Group for the coming operations to cross the Rhine.

Crossing the Rhine

In February 1945, Montgomery's 21st Army Group advanced to the Rhine in Operation Veritable and Operation Grenade. It crossed the Rhine on 24 March 1945, in Operation Plunder, which took place two weeks after U.S. First Army had crossed the Rhine after capturing the Ludendorff Bridge during the Battle of Remagen.

21st Army Group's river crossing was followed by the encirclement of the Ruhr Pocket. During this battle, U.S. Ninth Army, which had remained part of 21st Army Group after the Battle of the Bulge, formed the northern arm of the envelopment of German Army Group B, with U.S. First Army forming the southern arm. The two armies linked up on 1 April 1945, encircling 370,000 German troops, and on 4 April 1945, Ninth Army reverted to Omar Bradley's 12th Army Group.

By the war's end, the remaining formations of 21st Army group, First Canadian Army and British Second Army, had liberated the northern part of the Netherlands and captured much of north-west Germany, occupied Hamburg and Rostock and sealed off the Danish peninsula.

On 4 May 1945, on Lüneburg Heath, Montgomery accepted the surrender of German forces in north-west Germany, Denmark and the Netherlands.

Casualty conservation policy
The British high command were not only concerned with winning the war and defeating Germany, but also with ensuring that it retained sufficient influence in the post-war world to govern global policy. Suffering heavy losses in Normandy would diminish British leadership and prestige within its empire and on post-war Europe in particular. Many of Montgomery's clashes with Eisenhower were based on his determination to pursue the war "on lines most suitable to Britain".

The fewer the number of combat-experienced divisions the British had left at the end of the war, the smaller Britain's influence in Europe was likely to be, compared to the emerging superpowers of the United States and the Soviet Union. Montgomery was thus caught in a dilemma – the British Army needed to be seen to be pulling at least half the weight in the liberation of Europe, but without incurring the heavy casualties that such a role would inevitably produce. 21st Army Group scarcely possessed sufficient forces to achieve such a military prominence, and the remaining divisions had to be expended sparingly.

Britain, in 1944, did not possess the manpower to rebuild shattered divisions and it was imperative for Montgomery to protect the viability of the British army so that Britain could still play an important part in the final victory. It was reported to the War Office that "Montgomery has to be very careful of what he does on his eastern flank because on that flank is the only British Army there is left in this part of the world". The context of British casualties and the shortage of reinforcements, prompted Montgomery to "excessive caution". Dempsey wrote on 13 June, that Caen could only be taken by a "set piece assault and we did not have the men or the ammunition for that at the time".

Montgomery's solution to the dilemma was to attempt to remain Commander of All Land Forces until the end of the war, so that any victory attained on the Western front – although achieved primarily by American formations – would accrue in part to him and thus to Britain. He would also be able to ensure that British units were spared some of the high-attrition actions, but would be most prominent when the final blows were struck. When that strategy failed, he persuaded Eisenhower to occasionally put some American formations under the control of the 21st Army Group, so as to bolster his resources while still maintaining the outward appearance of successful British effort.

Montgomery initially remained prepared to push Second (British) Army hard to capture the vital strategic town of Caen, and consequently incur heavy losses. In the original Overlord plan, Montgomery was determined to push past Caen to Falaise as quickly as possible. However, after the heavy casualties incurred in capturing Caen, he changed his mind.

Personality
Montgomery was notorious for his lack of tact and diplomacy. Even his "patron", the Chief of the Imperial General Staff, General Sir Alan Brooke, frequently mentions it in his war diaries: "he is liable to commit untold errors in lack of tact" and  "I had to haul him over the coals for his usual lack of tact and egotistical outlook which prevented him from appreciating other people's feelings".

One incident that illustrated this occurred during the North African campaign when Montgomery bet Walter Bedell Smith that he could capture Sfax by the middle of April 1943. Smith jokingly replied that if Montgomery could do it he would give him a Flying Fortress complete with crew. Smith promptly forgot all about it, but Montgomery did not, and when Sfax was taken on 10 April he sent a message to Smith "claiming his winnings". Smith tried to laugh it off, but Montgomery was having none of it and insisted on his aircraft. It got as high as Eisenhower who, with his renowned skill in diplomacy, ensured Montgomery did get his Flying Fortress, though at a great cost in ill feeling. Even Brooke thought it crass stupidity.

Antony Beevor, in discussing Montgomery's counterproductive lack of tact in the final months of the war, described him as "insufferable". Beevor says that in January 1945 Montgomery had tried to claim far too much credit for the British (and for himself) in defeating the German counter-attack in the Ardennes in December 1944. This "crass and unpleasant blunder" helped make it impossible for Churchill and Field Marshal Alan Brooke to persuade Eisenhower of the need for an immediate thrust - to be led by Montgomery - through Germany to Berlin. Eisenhower did not accept the viability of the "dagger thrust" approach, it had already been agreed that Berlin would fall into the future Soviet occupation zone, and he was not willing to accept heavy casualties for no gain, so Eisenhower disregarded the British suggestions and continued with his conservative broad front strategy, and the Red Army reached Berlin well ahead of the Western Allies.

In August 1945, while Brooke, Sir Andrew Cunningham and Sir Charles Portal were discussing their possible successors as "Chiefs of Staff", they concluded that Montgomery would be very efficient as CIGS from the Army's point of view but that he was also very unpopular with a large proportion of the Army. Despite this, Cunningham and Portal were strongly in favour of Montgomery succeeding Brooke after his retirement. Prime Minister Winston Churchill, by all accounts a faithful friend, is quoted as saying of Montgomery, "In defeat, unbeatable; in victory, unbearable."

Montgomery suffered from "an overbearing conceit and an uncontrollable urge for self-promotion." General Hastings Ismay, who was at the time Winston Churchill's chief staff officer and trusted military adviser, once stated of Montgomery: "I have come to the conclusion that his love of publicity is a disease, like alcoholism or taking drugs, and that it sends him equally mad."

Later life

Post-war military career

After the war, Montgomery became the Commander-in-chief (C-in-C) of the British Army of the Rhine (BAOR), the name given to the British Occupation Forces, and was the British member of the Allied Control Council.

Chief of the Imperial General Staff
Montgomery was Chief of the Imperial General Staff (CIGS) from 1946 to 1948, succeeding Alan Brooke.

As CIGS, Montgomery toured Africa in 1947 and in a secret 1948 report to Prime Minister Clement Attlee's government proposed a "master plan" to amalgamate British Africa territories and to exploit the raw materials of Africa, thereby counteracting the loss of British influence in Asia.

However, Montgomery was barely on speaking terms with his fellow service chiefs, sending his deputy Kenneth Crawford to attend their meetings and he clashed particularly with Sir Arthur Tedder, who was by now Chief of the Air Staff (CAS).

When Montgomery's term of office expired, Prime Minister Attlee appointed Sir William Slim from retirement with the rank of field marshal as his successor. When Montgomery protested that he had told his protégé, General Sir John Crocker, former commander of I Corps in the 1944–45 North-West Europe Campaign, that the job was to be his, Attlee is said to have retorted "Untell him".

Western Union Defence Organization

Montgomery was then appointed Chairman of the Western Union Defence Organization's C-in-C committee. Volume 3 of Nigel Hamilton's Life of Montgomery of Alamein gives an account of the bickering between Montgomery and his land forces chief, French General Jean de Lattre de Tassigny, which created splits through the Union headquarters.

NATO
On the creation of the North Atlantic Treaty Organisation's Supreme Headquarters Allied Powers Europe in 1951, Montgomery became Eisenhower's deputy. He would continue to serve under Eisenhower's successors, Generals Matthew Ridgway and Al Gruenther, until his retirement, aged nearly 71, in 1958.

Personal
Montgomery was created 1st Viscount Montgomery of Alamein in 1946.

Montgomery's mother, Maude Montgomery, died at New Park in Moville in Inishowen in 1949. She was buried alongside her husband in the kirkyard behind St Columb's Church, the small Church of Ireland church beside New Park, overlooking Lough Foyle. Montgomery did not attend the funeral, claiming he was "too busy".

Montgomery was an Honorary Member of the Winkle Club, a charity in Hastings, East Sussex, and introduced Winston Churchill to the club in 1955.

He was chairman of the governing body of St. John's School in Leatherhead, Surrey, from 1951 to 1966, and a generous supporter.

He was also President of Portsmouth Football Club between 1944 and 1961.

Opinions

Memoirs

Montgomery's memoirs (1958) criticised many of his wartime comrades in harsh terms, including Eisenhower. He was threatened with legal action by Field Marshal Auchinleck for suggesting that Auchinleck had intended to retreat from the Alamein position if attacked again, and had to give a radio broadcast (20 November 1958) expressing his gratitude to Auchinleck for having stabilised the front at the First Battle of Alamein.

The 1960 paperback edition of Montgomery's memoirs contains a publisher's note drawing attention to that broadcast, and stating that although the reader might assume from Montgomery's text that Auchinleck had been planning to retreat "into the Nile Delta or beyond" in the publisher's view it had been Auchinleck's intention to launch an offensive as soon as the Eighth Army was "rested and regrouped". Montgomery was stripped of his honorary citizenship of Montgomery, Alabama, and was challenged to a duel by an Italian lawyer.

Montgomery mentioned to the American journalist John Gunther in April 1944 that (like Alanbrooke) he kept a secret diary. Gunther remarked that it would surely be an essential source for historians. When Montgomery asked whether it would be worth money one day, Gunther suggested "at least $100,000." This was converted into pounds sterling, and he is supposed to have grinned and said "Well, I guess I won't die in the poor house after all."

Military opinions
Montgomery twice met Israeli general Moshe Dayan. After an initial meeting in the early 1950s, Montgomery met Dayan again in the 1960s to discuss the Vietnam War, which Dayan was studying. Montgomery was harshly critical of US strategy in Vietnam, which involved deploying large numbers of combat troops, aggressive bombing attacks, and uprooting entire village populations and forcing them into strategic hamlets. Montgomery said that the Americans' most important problem was that they had no clear-cut objective, and allowed local commanders to set military policy. At the end of their meeting, Montgomery asked Dayan to tell the Americans, in his name, that they were "insane".

During a visit to the Alamein battlefields in May 1967, he bluntly told high-ranking Egyptian Army officers that they would lose any war with Israel, a warning that was shown to be justified only a few weeks later in the Six-Day War.

Social opinions
In retirement, Montgomery publicly supported apartheid after a visit to South Africa in 1962, and after a visit to China declared himself impressed by the Chinese leadership. He spoke out against the legalisation of homosexuality in the United Kingdom, arguing that the Sexual Offences Act 1967 was a "charter for buggery" and that "this sort of thing may be tolerated by the French, but we're British – thank God".

Montgomery was a teetotaller, a vegetarian, and a Christian.

Death

Montgomery died from unspecified causes in 1976 at his home Isington Mill in Isington, Hampshire, aged 88. After a funeral at St George's Chapel, Windsor, his body was buried in Holy Cross churchyard, in Binsted, Hampshire. He was survived by his son and only child David Montgomery, 2nd Viscount Montgomery of Alamein (1928–2020), as well as two grandchildren. His wife Betty Carver died in 1937.

His Garter banner, which had hung in St. George's Chapel in Windsor during his lifetime, is now on display in St Mary's, Warwick.

Legacy
 Montgomery's portrait by Frank O. Salisbury (1945) hangs in the National Portrait Gallery.
 A statue of Montgomery by Oscar Nemon stands outside the Ministry of Defence in Whitehall, alongside those of Field Marshal Lord Slim and Field Marshal Lord Alanbrooke.
 Montgomery gave his name to the French commune Colleville-Montgomery in Normandy.

 The Imperial War Museum holds a variety of material relating to Montgomery in its collections. These include Montgomery's Grant command tank (on display in the atrium at the Museum's London branch), his command caravans as used in North West Europe (on display at IWM Duxford), and his papers are held by the Museum's Department of Documents. The Museum maintains a permanent exhibition about Montgomery, entitled Monty: Master of the Battlefield.
 The World Champion Field Marshal Montgomery Pipe Band from Northern Ireland is named after him.
 Montgomery's Rolls-Royce staff car is on display at the Royal Logistic Corps Museum, Deepcut, Surrey.
 The Montgomery cocktail is a martini mixed at a ratio of 15 parts gin to 1 part vermouth, and popular with Ernest Hemingway at Harry's Bar in Venice. The drink was facetiously named for Montgomery's supposed refusal to go into battle unless his numerical advantage was at least fifteen to one, and it appeared in Hemingway's 1950 novel Across the River and into the Trees. Ironically, following severe internal injuries received in the First World War, Montgomery himself could neither smoke nor drink.

Honours and awards
 Viscountcy as Montgomery of Alamein (UK, January 1946)
 Knight of the Most Noble Order of the Garter (UK, 1946)
 Knight Grand Cross of the Most Honourable Order of the Bath (UK, 1945) KCB – 11 November 1942, CB – 11 July 1940
 Companion of the Distinguished Service Order (UK, 1914)
 Mentioned in Despatches (UK, 17 February 1915, 4 January 1917, 11 December 1917, 20 May 1918, 20 December 1918, 5 July 1919, 15 July 1939, 24 June 1943, 13 January 1944)
 Croix de Guerre 1914-1918 (France, 1919)
 Grand Cross of the Légion d'honneur (France, May 1945)
 Médaille militaire (France, 9 September 1958)
 Distinguished Service Medal (US, 1947)
 Chief Commander of the Legion of Merit (US, 10 August 1943)
 Member of the Order of Victory (USSR, 21 June 1945)
 Knight of the Order of the Elephant (Denmark, 2 August 1945)
 Grand Commander of the Order of George I (Greece, 20 June 1944)
 Silver Cross (V Class) of the Virtuti Militari (Poland, 31 October 1944)
 Grand Cross of the Military Order of the White Lion (Czechoslovakia, 1947)
 Grand Cordon of the Seal of Solomon (Ethiopia, 1949)
 Grand Officer with Palm of the Order of Leopold II (Belgium, 1947)
 Croix de Guerre 1940 with Palm (Belgium)
 Grand Cross of the Order of the Netherlands Lion (Netherlands, 16 January 1947)
 Grand Cross of the Royal Norwegian Order of St. Olav (Norway) (1951)

See also

 Afrika Korps
 M. E. Clifton James (Montgomery's double during the war)
 Tex Banwell (another double)
 Irish military diaspora
 Panzer Army Africa

References

Explanatory notes

Citations

Bibliography

Primary sources

External links

 British Army Officers 1939–1945
 Generals of World War II
 
 Montgomery and Anglo Polish relations during WWII
 
 Biography of Montgomery, Jewish Virtual Library website. Retrieved 10 April 2014.
 Profile, desertwar.net. Retrieved 10 April 2014.
 Viscount Montgomery of Alamein interview on BBC Radio 4 Desert Island Discs, 20 December 1969
 

1887 births
1976 deaths
People of Anglo-Irish descent
British expatriates in India
British expatriates in France
British Army personnel of World War I
British field marshals of World War II
British military personnel of the 1936–1939 Arab revolt in Palestine
British military personnel of the Irish War of Independence
British military personnel of the Palestine Emergency
Burials in Hampshire
Chief Commanders of the Legion of Merit
Chiefs of the Imperial General Staff
Companions of the Distinguished Service Order
Cultural depictions of Bernard Montgomery
Deputy Lieutenants of Hampshire
English people of Ulster-Scottish descent
Foreign recipients of the Distinguished Service Medal (United States)
Graduates of the Royal Military College, Sandhurst
Graduates of the Staff College, Camberley
Grand Commanders of the Order of George I
Grand Croix of the Légion d'honneur
Grand Crosses of the Order of the White Lion
Grand Officers of the Order of Leopold II
Knights Grand Cross of the Order of the Bath
Knights of the Garter
Members of the Privy Council of the United Kingdom
NATO military personnel
People educated at St Paul's School, London
People educated at The King's School, Canterbury
People from Kennington
Recipients of the Croix de Guerre 1914–1918 (France)
Recipients of the Croix de guerre (Belgium)
Recipients of the Cross of Valour (Greece)
Recipients of the Czechoslovak War Cross
Recipients of the Order of Suvorov, 1st class
Recipients of the Order of Victory
Recipients of the Silver Cross of the Virtuti Militari
Royal Warwickshire Fusiliers officers
Western Union (alliance) military appointments
Recipients of the Distinguished Service Medal (US Army)
Clan Montgomery
Academics of the Staff College, Quetta
Viscounts created by George VI
Military personnel from London
Academics of the Staff College, Camberley
Pakistan Command and Staff College alumni